DXMB (648 AM) RMN Malaybalay is a radio station owned and operated by the Radio Mindanao Network. The station's studio and transmitter are located at Purok 2, Brgy. San Jose, Malaybalay.

References

Radio stations in Bukidnon
Radio stations established in 1980
News and talk radio stations in the Philippines